The 2020 Rally Estonia (also known as the Rally Estonia 2020) was a motor racing event for rally cars that was held over three days between 4 and 6 September 2020. It marked the tenth running of Rally Estonia and was the fourth round of the 2020 World Rally Championship, World Rally Championship-2 and World Rally Championship-3. The 2020 event was based in the town of Tartu in Tartu County and consisted of seventeen special stages.

Ott Tänak and Martin Järveoja were the overall winners of the rally, winning their home event for the third straight year. Their team, Hyundai Shell Mobis WRT, were the manufacturers' winners. Mads Østberg and Torstein Eriksen were the winners in the WRC-2 category, while Oliver Solberg and Aaron Johnston won the WRC-3 class. In the junior championship, the Latvian crew of Mārtiņš Sesks and Renārs Francis won the event.

Background

Championship standings prior to the event
Six-time world champions Sébastien Ogier and Julien Ingrassia entered the round with an eight-point lead over Elfyn Evans and Scott Martin. Thierry Neuville and Nicolas Gilsoul were third, a further twelve points behind. In the World Rally Championship for Manufacturers, Toyota Gazoo Racing WRT held a twenty-one-point lead over defending manufacturers' champions Hyundai Shell Mobis WRT, following by M-Sport Ford WRT.

In the World Rally Championship-2 standings, Mads Østberg and Torstein Eriksen held a nine-point lead ahead of Nikolay Gryazin and Yaroslav Fedorov in the drivers' and co-drivers' standings respectively, with Pontus Tidemand and Patrick Barth in third. In the manufacturer' championship, Hyundai Motorsport N led M-Sport Ford WRT by twenty-two points. PH-Sport sit in third, a slender two points behind.

In the World Rally Championship-3 standings, the crew of Eric Camilli and François-Xavier Buresi, Jari Huttunen and Mikko Lukka, and Marco Bulacia Wilkinson and Giovanni Bernacchini all held twenty-five points in the standings.

In the junior championship, Tom Kristensson and Joakim Sjöberg led Mārtiņš Sesks and Renars Francis by nine points. Ken Torn and Kauri Pannas were third, a slender four points further back. In the Nations' championships, Sweden held a seven-point lead over Latvia, with Estonia in third.

Schedule changes and event inclusion

Following the impact of the COVID-19 pandemic on the championship, a number of events were cancelled or postponed indefinitely for health and safety grounds, with Rally Mexico abridged to give time for crews to head home due to lockdowns being implemented across the world. It was then announced on 2 July 2020 that the season would return with an updated calendar, with Rally Estonia hosting the resuming round between 4 and 6 September. The country became the thirty-third nation to stage a championship round in the WRC.

Entry list
The following crews entered into the rally. The event was open to crews competing in the World Rally Championship, its support categories, the World Rally Championship-2, World Rally Championship-3, and Junior World Rally Championship and privateer entries that were not registered to score points in any championship. Sixty entries were received, with thirteen crews entered in World Rally Cars, six Group R5 cars entered in the World Rally Championship-2, twenty-two in the World Rally Championship-3. A further twelve crews were entered in the Junior World Rally Championship in Ford Fiesta R2s.

Route
The rally features a short format schedule, which lasts only three days. This leads to the change of road order rules—Saturday's first loop would start as championship order, while the second loop would revert to the standard reversed order, which usually comes into effect on the second leg.

Itinerary
All dates and times are EEST (UTC+3).

Report

World Rally Cars
Local heroes Ott Tänak and Martin Järveoja led almost the entire rally to win their home event. Kalle Rovanperä and Jonne Halttunen received a one-minute time penalty for illegally removing the radiator blanking plate. Thierry Neuville and Nicolas Gilsoul retired from Saturday afternoon after they damaged their rear-right suspension. The Belgian crew's rally was further compromised as they suffered an electrical issue in the penultimate Power Stage. Takamoto Katsuta and Daniel Barritt crashed out on Sunday, while Pierre-Louis Loubet and Vincent Landais retired from their top-tier debut when they broke their steering.

Classification

Special stages

Championship standings

World Rally Championship-2
Mads Østberg and Torstein Eriksen dominated the class after a puncture. Early leaders Ole Christian Veiby and Jonas Andersson retired from Saturday when they hit a radiator issue. Things went from bad to worse when they rolled their Hyundai in the final stage after the restart. Teammate Nikolay Gryazin and Konstantin Aleksandrov could've finished second, but a puncture dropped them three minutes and tumbled to fifth.

Classification

Special stages

Championship standings

World Rally Championship-3
Oliver Solberg and Aaron Johnston overcame two punctures to lead the class on Saturday, and easily won the class. Major retirements were Kajetan Kajetanowicz and Maciej Szczepaniak, Gustav Kruuda and Ken Järveoja, and Raul Jeets and Andrus Toom. All three crews were forced to retire as they rolled their cars.

Classification

Special stages

Championship standings

Junior World Rally Championship
Despite the fact that Robert Virves and Sander Pruul failed to win a stage, consistent pace helped the local crew to the junior class. However, the local crew suffered a puncture on Sunday, which handed the victory to the Latvian crew of Mārtiņš Sesks and Renars Francis.

Classification

Special stages

Championship standings

Notes

References

External links
  
 2020 Rally Estonia at ewrc-results.com
 The official website of the World Rally Championship

2020 in Estonian sport
Estonia
September 2020 sports events in Europe
2020